Kamtuleh or Kamtooleh may refer to:
 Kamtuleh-ye Shahriari
 Kamtuleh-ye Yusefabad